The President's Commission on Excellence in Special Education was a Presidential Commission formed by United States President George W. Bush on October 2, 2001, through the  and amended on February 6, 2002, through .

The commission issued its final report on July 1, 2002.

References

Excellence in Special Education, President's Commission on
Education policy in the United States
Presidency of George W. Bush